Opala is a surname. Notable people include:
 Joseph Opala (born 1950), American historian
 Marian Opala (1921–2010), American judge
 Rosemary Opala (1923–2008), Australian writer and nurse

See also
 

Polish-language surnames